Sarpir-maṇḍa was a type of dairy product, from five stages of milk described in Hinduism and Buddhist texts.

As in Buddhist texts 

Buddhist texts including Nirvana Sutra describes five stages of milk as an analogy to stages of purification of spirit:

Milk yields curd; curd yields butter; butter yields sarpis; sarpis yields sarpir-maṇḍa; sarpir-maṇḍa is the best.

Sarpir-maṇḍa was most probably the early form of ghee.

In East Asia 

In Chinese Buddhist texts, sarpir-maṇḍa was translated to tíhú. (醍醐) The entry for tíhú in Compendium of Materia Medica (1578) quotes various references, the earliest of which was written in 5th century Liu Song dynasty.

The word 醍醐 is pronounced daigo in Japan. The word has been used in Daigo Temple, Emperor Daigo, (who has been named after the temple,) and the word daigo-mi (醍醐味), which means a superb flavor.

The Japanese Dairy Association claims that Emperor Daigo encouraged the production of so, daigo, and other cheese-like products during this reign in the 10th century.

See also
Chrism
Ghee
Whey

References

Dairy products
Religious food and drink
Food and drink in Hinduism
Food and drink in Buddhism